Rodnay Zaks (born 10 February 1946, Paris) is a French-born American author of many books on computer programming, including the seminal Programming the Z80 and Programming the 6502. He is the founder of independent computer book publisher Sybex and was its president and chief executive officer (CEO) until its takeover by John Wiley & Sons in May 2005.

Zaks has an engineering degree from the École Centrale Paris and a master's degree from the University of California, Berkeley, where he also was the third person to receive a Doctor of Philosophy (PhD) from the then new computer science department. He began a career in training engineers and managers in the then new microprocessor technology, and subsequently founded Sybex in 1976.

Zaks has been a director of Association for Computing Machinery's (ACM) Special Interest Group on Microarchitecture (SIGMICRO), and founded the non-profit organization EUROMICRO.

An early publication of Zaks' from Sybex was A microprogrammed APL implementation which includes the complete source code listing for the microcode for a Digital Scientific Corporation Meta 4 microprogrammable processor implementing the programming language APL.

Selected publications

References

External links
 , Sybex

American computer programmers
American computer scientists
French computer scientists
École Centrale Paris alumni
1946 births
Living people
UC Berkeley College of Engineering alumni